Karl or Carl Richter may refer to:

Karl Richter (botanist) (1855–1891), Austro-Hungarian botanist
Karl Richter (conductor) (1926–1981), German conductor, organist, and harpsichordist
Karl Richter (sport shooter) (1876–1959), Swedish sport shooter
Karl Richter (tennis) (born 1960), American tennis player
Karl W. Richter (1942–1967), American US Air Force officer
Carl Richter (1887–1918), German gymnast